The 2000 Mountain West Conference baseball tournament took place from May 17 through 20. This was the first championship tournament for the conference, which was formed prior to the 2000 NCAA Division I baseball season. All six of the league's teams met in the double-elimination tournament held at University of Nevada, Las Vegas's Earl Wilson Stadium. Second seeded San Diego State won the inaugural Mountain West Conference Baseball Championship with a championship game score of 9–4. As the Mountain West was a new league, they did not possess an automatic bid to the 2000 NCAA Division I baseball tournament, and no conference team was invited.

Seeding 
The teams were seeded based on regular season conference winning percentage only. BYU claimed the third seed over Utah by winning the season series.

Results

All-Tournament Team 
The following teams were named to the All-Tournament team.

Most Valuable Player 
Chad Redfern, an outfielder for the champion San Diego State Aztecs, was named the tournament Most Valuable Player.

References 

Tournament
Mountain West Conference baseball tournament
Mountain West Conference baseball tournament
Mountain West Conference baseball tournament
College baseball tournaments in Nevada
Sports competitions in the Las Vegas Valley